Günther Anders (born 8 November 1908 in Berlin; died 16 September 1977 in Munich) was a German cameraman and cinematographer.

Life
Anders was the son of a director of the film production company Eiko, later sales director for UFA. As early as 1918 he was appearing in child roles in silent films.

After leaving school in 1922 and completing an apprenticeship in the photographic department at UFA he trained at the State School of Phototechnics (Staatliche Hochschule für Fototechnik) in Munich. He then spent some years as an assistant to Carl Hoffmann, Karl Freund and Eugen Schüfftan. In 1934 he took full charge of the camera for the first time in Ich bin Du, a short film directed by Hoffmann.

After a considerable quantity of drama films Anders was reckoned among the top cameramen in the Third Reich. Besides his drama work he was involved in several significant propaganda films, such as Wunschkonzert and the anti-Polish production Heimkehr.  On these he worked principally with the directors Karl Ritter and Gustav Ucicky. In the winter of 1944/45 he was cameraman on the last, unfinished, large-scale production of this era, Das Leben geht weiter ("Life Goes On").

In 1947 he began his post-war activity with the drama Zwischen gestern und morgen about returnees. As part of the cinema boom of the 1950s Anders received many commissions as cameraman, mostly in Austria. In 1965 he was successful in bringing the estranged  brothers Attila Hörbiger and Paul Hörbiger together in front of the camera for the filming of the stage play Der Alpenkönig und der Menschenfeind, of which he was the director. His last film was in 1968.

Günther Anders was married, as his second wife, to the costumier Charlotte Flemming.

Filmography 

1935: Das Einmaleins der Liebe
1935: The Valiant Navigator
1935: Victoria
1935: Die lustigen Weiber
1936: Die Hochzeitsreise
1936: Susanne in the Bath
1937: The Ruler
1937: Patriots
1937: My Son the Minister
1937: Unternehmen Michael
1937:  Diamonds 
1937: Urlaub auf Ehrenwort
1938: Capriccio 
1938: Pour le Mérite
1939: Castles in the Air 
1939: Hochzeitsreise
1939: Legion Condor 
1939: Cadets 
1940: Wunschkonzert1941: Heimkehr1942: Hochzeit auf Bärenhof1942: Whom the Gods Love 
1943: Das Ferienkind1944: Am Ende der Welt1944: Schrammeln1944: Der gebieterische Ruf1944: The Heart Must Be Silent1945: Das Leben geht weiter (unfinished)
1947: Between Yesterday and Tomorrow1948: Fregola1948: Ulli and Marei1948: The Angel with the Trumpet1948: Das Kuckucksei1949: Eroica1949: Bonus on Death1950: Archduke Johann's Great Love1951: Gateway to Peace1951: A Devil of a Woman1951: The Blue Star of the South1951: Vienna Waltzes1952: Ich hab mich so an Dich gewöhnt1952: Until We Meet Again1953: A Musical War of Love1954: Cabaret1954: Fireworks1954: The Confession of Ina Kahr1955: The Last Ten Days1955: Island of the Dead1955: A Heart Full of Music 
1955: The Barrings1955: Dunja1956: Crown Prince Rudolph's Last Love 
1956: Lügen haben hübsche Beine1956: My Husband's Getting Married Today1956: 1956: Kaiserjäger1957: The Girl and the Legend1957: Die unentschuldigte Stunde1957: The Saint and Her Fool1958: Vienna, City of My Dreams1958: Heart Without Mercy1958: 1958: Stefanie1958: The Priest and the Girl1959: Arena of Fear1959: The Beautiful Adventure1960: Beloved Augustin1960: A Glass of Water1960: Faust1960: The Haunted Castle1960: Gustav Adolf's Page1961: Beloved Impostor 
1961: The Last of Mrs. Cheyney1961: The Liar1963: Miracle of the White Stallions1963: A Nearly Decent Girl1963: The House in Montevideo1965: Der Alpenkönig und der Menschenfeind (also directed)
1965: 1967: Rosalinde (TV)
1968: A Village Romeo and Juliet (TV)
1968: Der Schwanensee (TV)
1968: Pole Poppenspäler (TV; director)

 Awards 
1961: Filmband in Gold (Camera) for A Glass of Water1961: Preis der deutschen Filmkritik for The Haunted Castle and A Glass of Water1962: Der letzte Preis for Ukte''

References

External links 

Filmportal.de: Günther Anders

1908 births
1977 deaths
German cinematographers
Film people from Berlin